Brenda Paik Sunoo is a third generation Korean-American. She is a writer, an award-winning freelance journalist, and a former senior editor of Workforce Magazine. During the 1970s, Brenda and her husband were anti-war and human rights activists, particularly advocating for Korean unification. Paik Sunoo co-founded the non-profit organization Compassion At Work.

Biography
Paik Sunoo graduated from University of California, Los Angeles with a B.A. in Sociology. In 1999, she received her Master of Fine Arts in Creative Writing from Antioch University, Los Angeles.

Her memoir on loss and healing, Seaweed and Shamans: Inheriting the Gifts of Grief, has been published in English, Korean and Vietnamese. Her photo essay collection "Vietnam Moment" conveys her knowledge of and affection for the Vietnamese people. The photos in the book were taken during her stay at Vietnam from 2002 to 2008. The book is also printed in three languages: Korean, Vietnamese and English.

Books
 Beyond the crucible: Responses to anti-Asian hatred, Ecumenical Working Group of Asian Pacific Americans and Canadians, 1994
 Da Lat: City of Eternal Spring, The Gioi Publishers, 2004
 Seaweed and Shamans, Seoul Selection, 2006
 Vietnam Moment, Seoul Selection, 2009
 Moon Tides: Jeju Island Grannies of the Sea, 2011
 Stone House on Jeju Island  Improvising Life Under a Healing Moon, September 2018

References

Awards
 Maggie Award recognition in the Public Service category

External links
 Compassion At Work website

Living people
American writers of Korean descent
American women journalists
Women memoirists
American women non-fiction writers
Year of birth missing (living people)
21st-century American women
American activist journalists